Hagewood is an unincorporated community in Natchitoches Parish, Louisiana, United States.

Natchitoches Parish, Louisiana